The South Point 400 is a NASCAR Cup Series stock car race held annually at Las Vegas Motor Speedway in Las Vegas, Nevada, with the other one being the Pennzoil 400, The race is held on the last weekend of September and is the fourth race of the Cup Series playoffs, and the first race in the Round of 12.

History
On March 8, 2017, it was announced that the fall race at New Hampshire Motor Speedway would move to Las Vegas Motor Speedway starting in 2018.

The fall race at Las Vegas will become the first race of the Monster Energy NASCAR Cup Series playoffs to replace Chicagoland Speedway, which will move back to July. The South Point Hotel, Casino & Spa, owned by Semi-retired NASCAR driver Brendan Gaughan's father and LVMS partner Michael, became the title sponsor of the race.

The 2019 race was moved to prime-time to make it more comfortable for both the drivers and fans due to the searing September heat with the race ending under the lights. 

In 2020, the race was held as the first race of the Round of 12 as part of a schedule realignment.

Past winners

Notes
2018 & 2020 Race extended due to a NASCAR Overtime finish.
2019 First scheduled nighttime Cup race in the track's history.

Multiple winners (teams)

Manufacturer wins

References

External links
 

2018 establishments in Nevada
NASCAR Cup Series races
 
Recurring sporting events established in 2018
Annual sporting events in the United States